Turkey Creek is a stream in the U.S. state of Ohio. It is a tributary of the Ohio River.

Turkey Creek was named for the abundance of wild turkeys in the area.

See also
List of rivers of Ohio

References

Rivers of Scioto County, Ohio
Rivers of Ohio